Vinegar valentines were a type of cheeky postcard decorated with a caricature and insulting poem.  A lampoon of Valentine's Day cards, the unflattering novelty items enjoyed a century of popularity beginning in the 1840s during the Victorian era.

These cynical, sarcastic, often mean-spirited cards were first produced in America by a variety of printing companies, including Elton, Fisher, Strong and Turner. By the 1870s, other entrepreneurs such as New York printer, John McLoughlin, and his cartoonist, Charles Howard were creating their own lines of cards.

Cheaply made, vinegar valentines were usually printed on one side of a single sheet of paper and cost only a penny. Some people mistakenly call them penny dreadfuls, but that term refers to a form of potboiler fiction. They often featured garish caricatures of men like the "Dude" or women like the "Floozy." One reason they rapidly became popular throughout America and Europe was because literacy rates were increasing at that time among the poor and working classes who rarely had much more than a penny to spend on such luxuries. But, according to noted valentine authority Nancy Rosin, president of the National Valentine Collectors Association, their use wasn't restricted to the lower economic classes.

The unflattering cards reportedly created a stir throughout all social levels, sometimes provoking fisticuffs and arguments. The receiver, not the sender, was responsible for the cost of postage up until the 1840s. A person in those days paid for the privilege of being insulted by an often anonymous "admirer." Millions of vinegar valentines, with verses that insulted a person's looks, intelligence, or occupation, were sold between the 19th and 20th centuries. Art and design historian Annebella Pollen has extensively researched their production and reception in Britain, where they were more commonly called 'mock' or 'mocking' valentines.

The cards are usually simply a sheet of thin, colored paper, about the size of a modern greeting card.  They were later also produced in the form of postcards.  They were usually sent anonymously.  Postmasters sometimes confiscated these cards as unfit to be mailed.

By the 1950s, after their heyday, vinegar valentines cost five cents.

In popular culture
One pop culture reference to vinegar valentines is found in the Bill Watterson comic strip Calvin and Hobbes, where Calvin has given Susie Derkins the cards.

References

External links
 Vinegar Valentines: A mean note on day of love
 Happy Valentine's Day: I Hate You Collectors' Weekly
 Love Letters and Hate Mail Brighton Museums
 "The valentine has fallen upon evil days:" mocking Victorian Valentines and the ambivalent laughter of the carnivalesque Early Popular Visual Culture 
 Eight incredibly offensive Victorian valentines BBC

Ephemera